SS Anglo Saxon was an iron screw steam ship belonging to the Montreal Ocean Steamship Company which was wrecked with great loss of life on the Newfoundland coast on 27 April 1863.

Ship history
Anglo Saxon was built by William Denny and Brothers of Dumbarton, Scotland, in 1856, and operated on the Liverpool-Canada route.

On her final voyage she was commanded by Captain William Burgess. She sailed from Liverpool for Quebec on 16 April 1863, with a total of 445 aboard; 360 passengers and 85 crew. On 27 April, in dense fog, she ran aground in Clam Cove about four miles north of Cape Race. The ship broke up within an hour of hitting the rocks, and sank. Of those on board 237 people died, making this one of Canada's worst shipwrecks.

Among those saved was Anne Bertram, sister of John Bertram and George Hope Bertram, both later Canadian Members of Parliament, who was travelling with Charlotte Hope, daughter of Scots agriculturalist, George Hope.

References

Wreck of the Anglo Saxon at theshipslist.com
Report on the wreck in the Liverpool Mercury

1856 ships
Ships built on the River Clyde
Shipwrecks of the Newfoundland and Labrador coast
Steamships of Canada
Maritime incidents in April 1863